Shamspur is a village in Shaheed Bhagat Singh Nagar district of Punjab State, India. The village is administrated by Sarpanch an elected representative of the village.

Demography 
As of 2011, Shamspur has a total number of 134 houses and population of 590 of which 289 include are males while 301 are females according to the report published by Census India in 2011. The literacy rate of Shamspur is 70.35% lower than the state average of 75.84%. The population of children under the age of 6 years is 74 which is 12.54% of total population of Shamspur, and child sex ratio is approximately 1000 as compared to Punjab state average of 846.

Most of the people are from Schedule Caste which constitutes 26.78% of total population in Shamspur. The town does not have any Schedule Tribe population so far.

As per the report published by Census India in 2011, 404 people were engaged in work activities out of the total population of Shamspur which includes 194 males and 210 females. According to census survey report 2011, 91.83% workers describe their work as main work and 8.17% workers are involved in Marginal activity providing livelihood for less than 6 months.

Education 
KC Engineering College and Doaba Khalsa Trust Group Of Institutions are the nearest colleges.

List of schools nearby
Govt Upper Primary with Secondary School, Kot Ranjha
Govt Upper Primary with Secondary/Higher Secondary School, Jadla
Govt Primary School, Chhokran
Govt Primary School, Ranewal

Transport 

See also 
List of villages in India

References

External links 
 Tourism of Punjab
 Census of Punjab
 Locality Based PINCode

Villages in Shaheed Bhagat Singh Nagar district